The Hopewell Township School District is a community public school district that serves students in kindergarten through eighth grade from Hopewell Township and Shiloh, in Cumberland County, New Jersey, United States.

As of the 2020–21 school year, the district, comprised of one school, had an enrollment of 496 students and 36.0 classroom teachers (on an FTE basis), for a student–teacher ratio of 13.8:1.

The district is classified by the New Jersey Department of Education as being in District Factor Group "CD", the sixth-highest of eight groupings. District Factor Groups organize districts statewide to allow comparison by common socioeconomic characteristics of the local districts. From lowest socioeconomic status to highest, the categories are A, B, CD, DE, FG, GH, I and J.

Public school students from both communities in ninth through twelfth grades attend Cumberland Regional High School, which also serves students from Deerfield Township, Fairfield Township, Greenwich Township, Stow Creek Township and Upper Deerfield Township. As of the 2020–21 school year, the high school had an enrollment of 1,032 students and 78.5 classroom teachers (on an FTE basis), for a student–teacher ratio of 13.1:1.

History
The Shiloh School was closed after the end of the 2006-07 school year, and all students from Shiloh are being sent to the Hopewell Crest School as part of a sending/receiving relationship, accounting for nearly 10% of the Hopewell district's enrollment.

School
Hopewell Crest School had an enrollment of 496 students in grades PreK-8 as of the 2020–21 school year.

Administration
Core members of the district's administration are:
Meghan Lammersen, Superintendent
Stephanie Kuntz, Business Administrator / Board Secretary

Board of education
The district's board of education is comprised of nine members who set policy and oversee the fiscal and educational operation of the district through its administration. As a Type II school district, the board's trustees are elected directly by voters to serve three-year terms of office on a staggered basis, with three seats up for election each year held (since 2012) as part of the November general election. The board appoints a superintendent to oversee the district's day-to-day operations and a business administrator to supervise the business functions of the district.

References

External links
Hopewell Crest School

School Data for the Hopewell Crest School, National Center for Education Statistics
Cumberland Regional High School

Hopewell Township, Cumberland County, New Jersey
New Jersey District Factor Group CD
School districts in Cumberland County, New Jersey
Shiloh, New Jersey